Hemiclepsis is a genus of leeches belonging to the family Glossiphoniidae.

The species of this genus are found in Eurasia.

Species:
 Hemiclepsis chharwardamensis Mandal, 2013 
 Hemiclepsis marginata (Müller, 1774)

References

Leeches